Autney is an unincorporated community in McDuffie County, in the U.S. state of Georgia.

History
A post office called Autney was established in 1888, and remained in operation until 1917. In 1900, the community had 53 inhabitants.

References

Unincorporated communities in McDuffie County, Georgia
Unincorporated communities in Georgia (U.S. state)